Acanthopolymastia bathamae is a species of sea sponge belonging to the family Polymastiidae. It is only known from the Papanui Submarine Canyon off Dunedin, South Island, New Zealand.

This is a small, cream-coloured hemispherical sponge up to 8 mm in diameter. Its texture is soft and velvety with a single central papilla up to 7 mm in height.

References

Sponges of New Zealand
Animals described in 1997
Polymastiidae
Taxa named by Michelle Kelly (marine scientist)
Taxa named by Patricia Bergquist